Christopher Patrick Stolle (born April 1, 1958) is a former member of the Virginia House of Delegates representing 83rd district, which includes portions of the cities of Virginia Beach and Norfolk. A Republican, he first won election in 2009 by defeating Democratic incumbent Joseph Bouchard by an eighteen-point margin. He took the oath of office on January 13, 2010 in Richmond, Virginia. Del. Stolle was re-elected on Nov. 9, 2011, securing almost 97% of all votes. Del. Stolle is an OB/GYN and Vice President of Medical Affairs at Riverside Regional Medical Center. He is the brother of Virginia Beach Sheriff and former State Senator Ken Stolle and state senator Siobhan Dunnavant. He lost re-election to Democrat Nancy Guy in 2019.

References

External links
 Official member bio

Living people
Republican Party members of the Virginia House of Delegates
1958 births
Politicians from Norfolk, Virginia
21st-century American politicians